Leonidas Pereira Neto de Sousa (born 4 January 1979), known as Neto Pereira, is a Brazilian footballer who plays for Serie D club A.C. Este.

Biography
Neto (means grandson), son of Mr. Pereira and Ms. (née) Sousa, started his career at Matsubara and played at 2000 Torneo di Viareggio where he was scouted.

Itala San Marco
Neto Neto Pereira joined Italian Serie D side Itala San Marco in January 2001. Neto Neto Pereira played for the club for 9 years and won the Serie D group stage champion in 2008. In 2004, he was trailed at Triestina but the transfer was failed due to work permit issue (Serie B clubs cannot sign non-EU players abroad nor from Serie D). He was allowed to remain at the promoted side for Lega Pro Seconda Divisione 2008-09 season and played as captain.

Varese
On 31 January 2010, he was loaned to Lega Pro Prima Divisione side Varese as the club did not have a true regular goalscorer except Osariemen Ebagua. Neto Neto Pereira scored an equalizer goal in his debut against Benevento. The match ended in 1-1 draw. The club won promotion to Serie B at the end of season and signed him to a permanent deal.

In his debut in the Italian second division, he scored a goal against Torino, while Varese won 2-1 at the Stadio Olimpico di Torino.

Padova
On 17 July 2015, after remaining free agent, signing for Padova in Lega Pro.

References

External links
 
 Profile at AIC.Football.it 
 

1979 births
Living people
Brazilian footballers
Brazilian expatriate footballers
S.S.D. Varese Calcio players
Calcio Padova players
A.C. Mestre players
Serie B players
Serie C players
Serie D players
Brazilian expatriate sportspeople in Italy
Expatriate footballers in Italy
Association football forwards
Sportspeople from Paraná (state)